The 2020 RFL League 1 was a professional rugby league football competition played in England and Wales and is the third tier of the sport for Rugby Football League (RFL) affiliated clubs. The sponsors for the league were the bookmakers, Betfred and the league continued to be known as the Betfred League 1.

The league was to have followed the same structure that was in place for the 2019 season and consist of 22 rounds with each of the 11 teams playing 20 fixtures against each other home and away and two bye rounds.  The team finishing top would have won automatic promotion to the 2021 Championship and be named league champions for 2020.  The teams finishing second to sixth were meet in a series of play-off games culminating in the League 1 Play-Off Final.  The winner of this match will also be promoted to the Championship for 2021.

The season did sees the introduction of golden point extra time but no matches went to extra time before he season was suspended and subsequently abandoned. Extra-time will consist of two periods of five minutes but unlike the version in use in the Super League where winner takes all, in League 1 each team will earn a point for a game where the scores finish level at the end of normal time with a third point awarded to the first team to score during extra-time.

On 16 March the structure and timing of the competition was placed in doubt as all rugby league games were suspended until 3 April at least as part of the United Kingdom's response to the coronavirus pandemic.  The suspension of the season was extended to indefinite.

A discussion between the RFL and club officials in May saw seven of the 11 clubs reject a suggestion that the season could recommence with games being played behind closed doors.  The RFL board met on 20 July and having consulted with the League 1 clubs decided to abandon the 2020 season as the majority of clubs did not support playing behind closed doors.  At the date of suspension only two rounds of matches had been played and the season was declared null and void.

Teams

*capacity for rugby league games may differ from official stadium capacity.

Results

Round 1
All the ties in round one were due to be played on 15–16 February but all were postponed. Four due to one or both clubs in the tie being involved in rescheduled Challenge Cup third round ties, the original dates having been affected by Storm Ciara. The remaining match (North Wales Crusaders v Doncaster) was postponed due to a waterlogged pitch caused by Storm Dennis.

Round 2

Round 3

Standings at date of abandonment

References

RFL League 1
2020 in English rugby league
RFL League 1
RFL League 1